Taiporoporo / Charles Sound is a fiord of the South Island of New Zealand. It is one of the fiords that form the coast of Fiordland.

Geography
{ "type": "ExternalData", "service": "geoshape", "ids": "Q32157967", "properties": { "fill": "#0050d0"}}
The fiord is located between Taitetimu / Caswell Sound and Hinenui / Nancy Sound, on the central Fiordland coast. It is 14 kilometres in length, and extends in a roughly northwestern direction. In its upper reaches the fiord splits into two arms of similar length, the Emelius Arm (to the north) and the Gold Arm (to the south). The Gold Arm is protected by the Kahukura (Gold Arm) Marine Reserve. Other parts of the fiord are included in the Taumoana (Five Fingers Peninsula) Marine Reserve.

The Irene and Windward Rivers flow respectively into the ends of the Emelius and Gold Arms. The short Juno River enters to Tasman Sea just to the north of the fiord's mouth.

Several small islands are located within the fiord, including Catherine Island and Fanny Island in the Gold Arm and Eleanor Island at the mouth of the Emelius Arm.

History
Charles Sound was known as Charlie's Sound during the early to mid-19th century. It was very probably named after Charles MacLaren, the captain of the Sydney Cove, a sealing boat that visited the sound in 1810. In October 2019, the name of the fiord was officially altered to Taiporoporo / Charles Sound.

2003 tsunami
During the magnitude 7.0 23 August 2003 Fiordland earthquake, a significant landslide swept into Charles Sound causing a 4- to 5-metre high tsunami that damaged a wharf and helipad in the sound.

References

Sounds of Fiordland